Aleksandar Varjačić (born 23 May 1991) is a Serbian football defender.

Honours
Radnički Kragujevac
Serbian League West (2): 2009–10, 2016–17

Šapine
Dunav Zone League: 2015–16

References

External links
 
 Aleksandar Varjačić stats at utakmica.rs 
 

1991 births
Living people
Sportspeople from Kragujevac
Association football defenders
Serbian footballers
FK Radnički 1923 players
FK Radnik Surdulica players
FK Jagodina players
FK Karađorđe Topola players
Serbian First League players
Serbian SuperLiga players